

Peerage of England

|Earl of Surrey (1088)||John de Warenne, 6th Earl of Surrey||1240||1304||
|-
|rowspan="2"|Earl of Warwick (1088)||Margaret de Newburg, 7th Countess of Warwick||1242||1253||Died
|-
|William Maudit, 8th Earl of Warwick||1253||1267||
|-
|Earl of Leicester (1107)||Simon de Montfort, 6th Earl of Leicester||1218||1265|| 
|-
|Earl of Gloucester (1122)||Richard de Clare, 6th Earl of Gloucester||1230||1262||5th Earl of Hertford
|-
|Earl of Arundel (1138)||John FitzAlan, 6th Earl of Arundel||1243||1267||
|-
|rowspan="2"|Earl of Derby (1138)||William de Ferrers, 5th Earl of Derby||1247||1254||Died
|-
|Robert de Ferrers, 6th Earl of Derby||1254||1279||
|-
|Earl of Norfolk (1140)||Roger Bigod, 4th Earl of Norfolk||1225||1270||
|-
|Earl of Devon (1141)||Baldwin de Redvers, 7th Earl of Devon||1245||1262||
|-
|Earl of Oxford (1142)||Hugh de Vere, 4th Earl of Oxford||1221||1263||
|-
|Earl of Salisbury (1145)||Ela of Salisbury, 3rd Countess of Salisbury||1196||1261||
|-
|Earl of Hereford (1199)||Humphrey de Bohun, 2nd Earl of Hereford||1220||1275||1st Earl of Essex (1239)
|-
|Earl of Winchester (1207)||Roger de Quincy, 2nd Earl of Winchester||1219||1264||
|-
|Earl of Lincoln (1217)||Margaret de Quincy, Countess of Lincoln||1232||1266||
|-
|Earl of Cornwall (1225)||Richard, 1st Earl of Cornwall||1225||1272||
|-
|Earl of Richmond (1241)||Peter of Savoy, 1st Earl of Richmond||1241||1268||
|-
|Earl of Pembroke (1247)||William de Valence, 1st Earl of Pembroke||1247||1296||
|-
|Earl of Chester (1253)||Edward, Earl of Chester||1253||1272||New creation

Peerage of Scotland

|Earl of Mar (1114)||Uilleam, Earl of Mar||Abt. 1240||1281||
|-
|Earl of Dunbar (1115)||Patrick III, Earl of Dunbar||1248||1289||
|-
|Earl of Angus (1115)||Gilbert de Umfraville, Earl of Angus||1246||1307||
|-
|rowspan=2|Earl of Atholl (1115)||Forbhlaith, Countess of Atholl||1241||Abt. 1250||Died
|-
|Ada, Countess of Atholl||Abt. 1250||1264||
|-
|Earl of Buchan (1115)||Alexander Comyn, Earl of Buchan||Abt. 1243||1289||
|-
|Earl of Strathearn (1115)||Maol Íosa II, Earl of Strathearn||1245||1271||
|-
|Earl of Fife (1129)||Máel Coluim II, Earl of Fife||1228||1266||
|-
|rowspan=2|Earl of Menteith (1160)||Isabella, Countess of Menteith||Abt. 1230||1258||Died
|-
|Mary I, Countess of Menteith||1258||1295||
|-
|Earl of Lennox (1184)||Maol Domhnaich, Earl of Lennox||1220||1260||
|-
|rowspan=3|Earl of Carrick (1184)||Donnchadh, Earl of Carrick||1186||1250||Died
|-
|Niall, Earl of Carrick||1250||1256||Died
|-
|Marjorie, Countess of Carrick||1256||1292||
|-
|rowspan=2|Earl of Ross (1215)||Fearchar, Earl of Ross||1215||1251||Died
|-
|Uilleam I, Earl of Ross||1251||1274||
|-
|Earl of Sutherland (1235)||William de Moravia, 2nd Earl of Sutherland||1248||1307||
|-
|}

Peerage of Ireland

|Baron Athenry (1172)||Meyler de Bermingham||1244||1262||
|-
|Baron Kingsale (1223)||Patrick de Courcy, 2nd Baron Kingsale||1230||1260||
|-
|Baron Kerry (1223)||Thomas Fitzmaurice, 1st Baron Kerry||1223||1260||
|-
|}

References

 

Lists of peers by decade
1250s in England
1250s in Ireland
13th century in Scotland
13th-century English people
13th-century Irish people
13th-century mormaers
Peers